Nguyễn Khoa Toàn (1898-1965) was a Vietnamese painter. He studied in France and was regarded as a traditionalist. He was noted for his portraits of women of Huế, such as "Thanh minh", “Đường lên lăng”, “Mẹ con”.

References

1898 births
1965 deaths
20th-century Vietnamese painters